Sprouses Corner is an unincorporated community in Buckingham County, in the U.S. state of Virginia.

Chellowe was listed on the National Register of Historic Places in 1999.

References

Unincorporated communities in Virginia
Unincorporated communities in Buckingham County, Virginia